Nomin Bold is a Mongolian painter born in 1982 in Ulaanbaatar, Mongolia. She is part of a new generation of artists which uses the Mongol Zurag painting style. Nomin Bold studied Mongol Zurag at the School of Fine Arts at the Mongolian University of Arts and Culture. According to her, Nomin's paintings are influenced by the Buddhist Thangka paintings. She is married to a Mongolian artist Baatarzorig Batjargal.

dokumenta 14 
Two of her paintings, One Day of Mongolia 2017 (acrylic, gold sheets on canvas, 150×200 cm) and Grey Palace 2017 (acrylic on canvas, 150×200 cm) had been shown at documenta 14 in Kassel, Germany, at the Natural History Museum Ottoneum.

Notable exhibitions

Solo exhibitions 
2014     Naughty Game, at Art Space 976+, Ulaanbaatar, Mongolia

Group exhibitions 
2018     2nd Yinchuan Biennale, at Yinchuan, China

2017     documenta 14, at Kassel, Germany

2015     Asia Pacific Triennial, at Queensland, Australia

Paintings at Google Arts & Culture 
 The Painting Tomorrow at Google Arts & Culture
 The Painting Labyrinth game at Google Arts & Culture

References

External links 

 Interview with Nomin Bold
 Other paintings from Nomin Bold
 About Nomin Bold aichitriennale 2016
 About Nomin Bold in yinchuanbiennale
 Nomin Bold in art avenue
 The Painting Tomorrow (2014) from Nomin Bold is discussed

1982 births
Mongolian painters
Modern painters
Living people
21st-century Mongolian painters
21st-century Mongolian women